Dexter USD 471 is a public unified school district headquartered in Dexter, Kansas, United States.  The district includes the communities of Dexter, Maple City, and nearby rural areas.

The school mascot is the Cardinals, but for most athletics the district co-ops with nearby Cedar Vale to form the CVD Spartans.

See also
 Kansas State Department of Education
 Kansas State High School Activities Association
 List of high schools in Kansas
 List of unified school districts in Kansas

References

External links
 

School districts in Kansas